The River of Love (Nahr al-Hob) is a 1960 Egyptian romance film starring Faten Hamama and Omar Sharif. It is directed by the Egyptian film director Ezz El-Dine Zulficar and based on Leo Tolstoy's 1877 novel, Anna Karenina. The film was listed in the top 100 Egyptian films in 1996.

Plot 
Taher Pasha (Zaki Rostom), a wealthy and powerful man, falls in love with Nawal (Faten Hamama) and decides to marry her. She accepts in order to save her brother from jail due to unpaid debts. After their wedding, Nawal's life turns into a miserable one, living lonely in the Pasha's house. She gets pregnant and gives birth to her only child. A young military officer named Khalid (Omar Sharif) falls in love with Nawal, who returns his love.

For months the lovers keep their relationship a secret, until Taher Pasha finds out that his wife might be having an affair. She faces her tyrant husband and demands a divorce, but he refuses. Nawal's brother threatens to publicly revealing Taher's wrongdoings and transgressions to the press if he won't divorce Nawal. Nawal travels with Khalid to Lebanon. Taher Pasha sends some of his people to spy on her and receives pictures clearly showing Nawal with Khalid. Furious, Taher divorces her and keeps custody of their child. Khalid dies in a battle in the war. Nawal returns to Egypt and tries to get her child back, but fails. Despairing and devastated, Nawal commits suicide by binding herself to a railroad.

Cast 
Faten Hamama as Nawal
Omar Sharif as Khalid
Zaki Rostom as Taher Pasha
Omar El-Hariri as Mamdouh
Fuad Al Mohandes as Fuad, Khalid's friend

References

External links 

1960 films
1960s Arabic-language films
Egyptian romance films
1960s romance films
Films based on Anna Karenina
Films directed by Ezz El-Dine Zulficar